The Tender Hour is a 1927 American romantic drama film directed by George Fitzmaurice, written by Winifred Dunn, and starring Billie Dove, Ben Lyon, Montagu Love, Alec B. Francis, Constantine Romanoff, and Laska Winter. It was released on May 1, 1927, by First National Pictures.

Cast      
Billie Dove as Marcia Kane
Ben Lyon as Wally McKenzie
Montagu Love as Grand Duke Sergei
Alec B. Francis as Francis Chinilly
Constantine Romanoff as Gorki
Laska Winter as Tana
T. Roy Barnes as Tough-House Higgins
George Kotsonaros as The Wrestler
Charles A. Post as Pussy-Finger
Anders Randolf as Leader of Pageant 
Frank Elliott as Party Guest
Lionel Belmore as Party Guest
Lon Poff as Party Guest
August Tollaire as Prefect of Police
Yola d'Avril as Cabaret Girl
George Bunny (uncredited)

References

External links

Stills at silenthollywood.com
Lobby card and still at silentfilmstillarchive.com

1927 films
American romantic drama films
1927 romantic drama films
First National Pictures films
Films directed by George Fitzmaurice
American silent feature films
American black-and-white films
1920s English-language films
1920s American films
Silent romantic drama films
Silent American drama films